Trebišov is a small industrial town in the easternmost part of Slovakia, with a population of around 25,000. The town is an administrative, economic and cultural center with machine (Vagónka) and building materials industries.

History
The first archaeological findings are from the Neolithic. Tombs were found from the Otomani Culture of the early Bronze Age and the building structures from Hallstatt Culture from late Bronze Age.

The name of Trebišov is first mentioned in 1219 as Terebus, later in 1254 as Terebes, and in 1341 as Therebes, in 1441 the sources depict as Felse Terebes, Also Terebes (Upper and Lower Trebišov). The village is also mentioned in 1330, when it received town status for the first time. The castle and the village became one settlement in the 14th century.

The first written reference to the castle stems from 1254. This castle of Parič (Párics) stood at the border of the village. The village originally was established to serve the castle. The castle was built by Terebesi family from the Kaplon clan. Károly Róbert has conquered the castle in 1317 during the fight with Peter, son of Petenye and granted the land as gift to Philip Drugeth, the ispán of Szepes County, but then returned to royal ownership in 1342, to the Zemplén County. After 1387 the castle was given by Sigismund of Luxemburg to Péter Perényi, who soon became a "robber knight". Mathias Corvinus has overtaken the castle in 1483 and given the castle to the son of the defeated knight. As the Ottomans were approaching in 1536, the castle was reinforced, and further in 1541. The Drugeth family took over the castle by marriage in 1567, but in 1619, Gabriel Bethlen sieged and occupied it.

There is a record that in 1601 there were 31 populated and 94 non-populated houses in the settlement. The Pálos religious order had monastery here between 1504 and 1530, and 1630-1781 which is still standing.

The castle was once again reinforced, and Austrian forces occupied it in 1675. In 1682, Thököly Imre captured it and then fled from continuous Austrian attacks, so they blew the castle up, since then it has been in ruins. In 1692 Leopold I gave his rights on the property by a donation to Theresia Keglevich. From her descendants it came into the possession of the Csáky family. In 1786, the Csáky family was using the ruins to build another castle in the city. This castle moved to the Andrássy family by marriage in 1838 and rebuilt it in Neorenaissance style.

By 1787, the population had grown to 2,366. In 1831, the city was the center of the cholera uprising, which was suppressed by the military on 5 August. In the nineteenth century, the city was impacted by the waves of migration to America. The city's economy improved in the early twentieth century, when several agricultural enterprises were established, such as a sugar processing plant in 1910. In 1911, an electric power station built.

In 1910, there were 2,323 (49.34%) Hungarians and 2,181 (46.33%) Slovak from a population of 4,708. In 1929, the town became the seat of its own Trebišov County. During World War II, the Slovak population supported the partisan groups. The city was occupied by the Soviet Army on 1 December 1944. In January 1945, the Slovak National Council was formed here. The population in 2001 was 22,342, of which 87% were Slovak, 8.9% Roma and 1.7% Hungarian.

Noteworthy structures

Parič Castle ruins – built 1786 using stones of a water castle from the 13th century, with:
a National History and Geography Museum – in the castle
a park – once one of the prettiest parks in Austria-Hungary, contains remnants of the old water castle (13th century - 1786)
Andrássy Mausoleum – a nice neo-Gothic mausoleum of 1896
Catholic church – c. 1400, Gothic, reconstructed in 1696
Pauline monastery – 1502, connected with the Catholic Church
Orthodox church – 1825
manor house – 1786, adapted in the Empire – neo-Renaissance style

Roman Catholic Church of Virgin Mary's Annunciation

The church has been dated to 1404. It is an example of Gothic architecture. The church has a main part and the aisle chapels. The interior is composed of the altars, murals and a triumphal arch. On the ceiling, there are painted scenes from the life of the Virgin Mary. In the church there are set two marble epitaphs of János and Imre Perényi, the paintings "The Virgin Mary's Annunciation" (1780), "Saint Pavel Hermit" (18th century), "Saint Justin Martyr" (1835), a stone baptistery (18th century) and a pseudo-Rococo seat. Under the church, there are crypts of the Pereny's family and Péter Szapáry and Júlia Csáky.

Pauline Monastery

The monastery was built in 1502, and two years later, Imre Perenyi invited the Pauline monks to the monastery. The object of the Renaissance monastery in the shape of "L" had been linked right to the church with the south wing. The monastery was reconstructed, in 1678 and in 1760. With the elimination of the Pauline order in 1786 by King Joseph II., the monastery lost its original function and has since been used for many purposes. Now, it houses the Elementary Arts School and the Roman Catholic Parsonage Office.

Immaculata

The Immaculata is a work of art of an unknown sculptor. It was erected around 1800. There are three statues: The main is Madonna trampling a snake; on her right there is a statue of St. John of Nepomuk; on her left a statue of the patron and protector from fire, St. Florian. At present, it is placed in its third place. Originally it was placed in front of the manor house. Later, in 1907, it was placed south of the church, on the edge of the city park. In the 1980s, it was restored and placed between the Roman- and Greek-Catholic churches.

Greek-Catholic Church of Virgin Mary's Ascension

The cornerstone of the church was put in 1817. It was built by the architect József Turcsány during the years 1818–1825. It was dedicated in 1826. In 1886, its interior was rebuilt. There are many icons: The Death of Virgin Mary, icons of Jesus Christ, St. Nicholas, Twelve Apostles, Virgin Mary and John the Baptist. The sacristy, the art lustre and ceramic floor date to 1901, and the art windows to 1907. In the 1920s, the bell called "Georgij" (George) was added.

Ruins of Parič Castle

The first stage of the construction of the water castle (probably an inhabited tower with fortifications) can be dated to the 12th to 13th centuries. Pieces of pottery that have been found confirm this. The upper polygonal construction made by stone-based bricks was built in the second stage of construction, in the early 14th century. Research has confirmed that simultaneously with the fortification on the western side, an early-Gothic palace was built. On the east side of the castle a quadrangle entrance tower was built and at the courtyard was a well, fortified by stone.yhh

The Trebišov Park

The Park of Trebišov occupies an area of 62 ha. The park was originally part of a swamp-mire forest. The park began to be laid out in the 18th century. It started as an English countryside forest with buttonwoods and other trees imported from around the world. Today, the park is used for recreation, cultural and social events, and as a historical and archaeological site. In the area of the park there are, in addition to noteworthy fauna and flora, some historical monuments.

Church of the Holy Spirit

This church is one of Trebišov's oldest. Its foundations were discovered by chance at the Centre of Young Natural Scientists in Trebišov. Its existence confirmed the records of Popes Corporals from 1332 to 1337. The archaeological research has shown that the church had a rectangular nave. In 65 graves, this dead were buried on their backs without coffins, and primarily without gifts. Jewels, elements of clothing and coins were found in 16 graves. These included earrings, rings, Hungarian coins from second half of the 12th century and first third of the 13th century, and three cast bronze crucifixes, which belonged probably to the Eastern Church (Kievan Rus). Based on these discoveries, the church can be dated back to the first half of the 13th century, and its extension to around 1400.

Mausoleum of The Andrássy Family in The Town Park

The Mausoleum is one of the most beautiful monuments in Trebišov. It was built in the neo-Gothic style in 1893 by the German architect Arthur Meinig. The sarcophagus is a work of the Hungarian sculptor György Zala from the years 1893–1895. The Mausoleum houses the grave of count Gyula Andrássy from 1894, who was prime minister of Austria-Hungary (1867). In the sarcophagus, there are relicts of his wife Katalin Andrássy. Above the sarcophagus there are two bronze cartouches with the emblems of the count and his wife. Beside that there is the tin coffin of Tódor Andrássy (1857–1905). There is a sculpture of an angel. Near the sarcophagus, there is a bronze sculpture of Helena, the wife of count Lajos Batthyány. In the interior there are the starry vault and the neo-Gothic windows.

National History Museum

In 1786, count Imre Csáky started constructure on a great Baroque castle. The three-winged castle has a U-shaped floor-plan. The terrace is supported by eight Classicistic pillars. In the Baroque gable there are emblems of the Csáky and Andrássy families. The castle has a large French garden with a fountain and a labyrinth. From 1916, the castle housed military barracks and after the Second World War a hospital. Today the castle is used as the National History Museum.

Districts
Nový Majer
Olšina
Trebišov proper

Famous people
Marián Čalfa, politician
Marek Čech, footballer
Ján Novák, footballer
Kamila Domaracka (famous Slovak singer and acrylic artist)
Count Gyula Andrássy de Csíkszentkirály et Krasznahorka the Younger, Hungarian politician

Twin towns — sister cities

Trebišov is twinned with:
 Hodonín, Czech Republic
 Jasło, Poland

References
Notes

External links
Municipal website 

Cities and towns in Slovakia
Villages and municipalities in Trebišov District